Deliverance is the sixth studio album by Swedish progressive metal band Opeth. It was released on 12 November 2002. It was recorded between 22 July and 4 September 2002, at the same time as Damnation, which was released five months after this album. The two albums contrast starkly with one another, purposely dividing the band's two most prevalent styles, as Deliverance is considered to be one of the band's heaviest albums, whereas Damnation experiments with a much mellower progressive rock-influenced sound.

Background

The band originally intended for Deliverance and Damnation to be released as a double album, but the record company eventually decided against this and released them separately, approximately five months apart from one another in order to promote them properly. The recording sessions also became a writing session of two albums worth of material, causing the recordings to be long as there were no songs written prior to that point. Åkerfeldt wrote the songs in the night and recorded them with the band during the days.

The track "Master's Apprentices" was named after the Australian hard/progressive rock group The Masters Apprentices. "For Absent Friends" was named after a song on the album Nursery Cryme by progressive rock group Genesis.

At the end of "By the Pain I See in Others", the final note fades slowly and ends at 10:40. Silence follows until 12:00, followed by two backmasked (hidden tracks) verses from "Master's Apprentices" at 12:00 and 13:15.

Production

The recording for Deliverance and Damnation was fraught with troubles. The band had originally started recording the album in Nacksving Studio, but the recording process was plagued, not just by a variety of technical issues ranging from equipment breaking down to drum mics changing positions or disappearing, but also internal band issues. Eventually, the band would return to Studio Fredman (upon which they would be joined by producer Steven Wilson) to finish off the record.

During the recording process, Mikael Åkerfeldt's grandmother was killed in a car accident. He would later dedicate both Deliverance and Damnation to her.

Reception
Deliverance peaked on Top Heatseekers at No. 16 and the Top Independent Albums chart at No. 19, making it the first Opeth release ever to chart. Opeth also won a Grammis Award for Best Hard Rock Performance after releasing the album.

The album appeared on several lists of the best albums of 2002, including that of Kerrang!, Metal Hammer and Terrorizer. In 2012, Loudwire ranked Deliverance as the third best album of 2002.

Track listing

Personnel

Opeth
 Mikael Åkerfeldt – vocals, electric and acoustic guitars
 Peter Lindgren – electric guitars
 Martín Méndez – bass guitar
 Martin Lopez – drums, percussion

Additional personnel
 Steven Wilson – backing vocals, additional guitars, Mellotron, piano, keyboards, production, engineering
 Opeth – production, engineering
 Fredrik Nordström – engineering
 Fredrik Reymerdahl – engineering
 Andy Sneap – mixing
 Travis Smith – artwork

Chart positions

Monthly

References

External links
 Deliverance's equipment at Opeth.com (archived)

Opeth albums
2002 albums
Albums recorded at Studio Fredman
E1 Music albums
Albums with cover art by Travis Smith (artist)